Qingshanhu District, is one of 6 urban districts of the prefecture-level city of Nanchang, the capital of Jiangxi Province, China.

Administrative divisions
Qingshanhu is divided into 3 sub-districts, and 6 towns.

Sub-districts
 Qingshanlu
 Shanghailu
 Nangang

Towns

References

External links
Nanchang Qingshanhu District Government Web(Chinese)

Nanchang
County-level divisions of Jiangxi